The Hideaway Report is a membership-based editorial travel publisher that reviews luxury hotels and resorts, typically smaller, more individual ventures. The first issue appeared in 1979. "Andrew Harper," was the pen name of the original editor-in-chief. The publisher is Andrew Harper LLC.

Concerned about the influence of commercial considerations on travel reviews, he traveled anonymously and paid his own expenses. The editorial team continues that tradition today.

References

External links
 Andrew Harper Web Site

1979 establishments in Texas
Business magazines published in the United States
Magazines established in 1979
Magazines published in Austin, Texas
Monthly magazines published in the United States
Tourism magazines